The 1993–94 SM-liiga season was the 19th season of the SM-liiga, the top level of ice hockey in Finland. 12 teams participated in the league, and Jokerit Helsinki won the championship.

Standings

Playoffs

Quarterfinals
 TPS - HIFK 3:0 (4:1, 2:1, 7:3)
 Ässät - Tappara Tampere 2:3 (3:4, 2:5, 7:4, 5:4, 1:4)
 Jokerit - Ilves 3:1 (6:1, 4:1, 2:3, 5:1)
 Lukko - JYP 3:1 (3:1, 1:2, 4:1, 4:1)

Semifinal
 TPS - Tappara Tampere 3:1 (6:4, 1:3, 6:3, 4:2)
 Jokerit - Lukko 3:1 (2:0, 5:0, 0:4, 2:1 P)

3rd place
 Lukko - Tappara Tampere 3:2 P

Final
 TPS - Jokerit 1:3 (4:1, 0:3, 1:2, 2:3 P)

Relegation

External links
 SM-liiga official website

Fin
1993–94 in Finnish ice hockey
Liiga seasons